Seviyan is a village in the Barda Rayon of Azerbaijan.

This village may have undergone a name change or may no longer exist as an area of human habitation, since no Azerbaijani website seems to mention it under this name.

References
 

Populated places in Barda District